The Wimshurst influence machine is an electrostatic generator, a machine for generating high voltages developed between 1880 and 1883 by British inventor James Wimshurst (1832–1903).

It has a distinctive appearance with two large contra-rotating discs mounted in a vertical plane, two crossed bars with metallic brushes, and a spark gap formed by two metal spheres.

Description
These machines belong to a class of electrostatic generators called influence machines, which separate electric charges through electrostatic induction, or influence, not depending on friction for their operation. Earlier machines in this class were developed by Wilhelm Holtz (1865 and 1867), August Toepler (1865), J. Robert Voss (1880), and others. The older machines are less efficient and exhibit an unpredictable tendency to switch their polarity, while the Wimshurst machine has neither defect.

In a Wimshurst machine, the two insulated discs and their metal sectors rotate in opposite directions passing the crossed metal neutralizer bars and their brushes. An imbalance of charges is induced, amplified, and collected by two pairs of metal combs with points placed near the surfaces of each disc. These collectors are mounted on insulating supports and connected to the output terminals. The positive feedback increases the accumulating charges exponentially until the dielectric breakdown voltage of the air is reached and an electric spark jumps across the gap.

The machine is theoretically not self-starting, meaning that if none of the sectors on the discs has any electrical charge, there is nothing to induce charges on other sectors. In practice, even a small residual charge on any sector is enough to start the process going once the discs start to rotate. The machine will work satisfactorily only in a dry atmosphere. It requires mechanical power to turn the disks against the electric field, and it is this energy that the machine converts into the electric power of the spark. The steady-state output of the Wimshurst machine is a direct (non-alternating) current that is proportional to the area covered by the metal sector, the rotation speed, and a complicated function of the initial charge distribution. The insulation and size of the machine determine the maximal output voltage that can be reached. The accumulated spark energy can be increased by adding a pair of Leyden jars, an early type of capacitor suitable for high voltages, with the jars’ inner plates independently connected to each of the output terminals and the jars’ outer plates interconnected. A typical Wimshurst machine can produce sparks that are about a third of the disc's diameter in length and several tens of microamperes.

The available voltage gain can be understood by noting that the charge density on oppositely charged sectors, between the neutralizer bars, is nearly uniform across the sectors, and thus at low voltage, while the charge density on same charged sectors, approaching the collector combs, peaks near the sector edges, at a consequently high voltage relative to the opposite collector combs.

Wimshurst machines were used during the 19th century in physics research. They were also occasionally used to generate high voltage to power the first-generation Crookes X-ray tubes during the first two decades of the 20th century, although Holtz machines and induction coils were more commonly used. Today they are used only in science museums and education to demonstrate the principles of electrostatics.

Operation
The two contra-rotating insulating discs (usually made of glass) have a number of metal sectors stuck onto them. The machine is provided with four small brushes (two on each side of the machine on conducting shafts at 90° to each other), plus a pair of charge-collection combs. The conducting shafts, that hold the brushes on a typical Wimshurst machine, would form the shape of an "X", if one could see through the insulating discs, as they are perpendicular to each other. The charge-collection combs are typically mounted along the horizontal and equally contact the outer edges of both front and back discs. The collection combs on each side are usually connected to respective Leyden jars.

Any small charge on either of the two discs suffices to begin the charging process. Suppose, therefore, that the back disc has a small, net electrostatic charge. For concreteness, assume this charge is positive (red) and that the back disc ([A] lower chain) rotates counter-clockwise (right to left). As the charged sector (moving red square) rotates to the position of the brush ([Y] down arrow tip) next to front disc ([B] upper chain near center), it induces a polarization of charge on the conducting shaft ([Y-Y1] upper horizontal black line) holding the brush, attracting negative (green) charge to the near side ([Y] upper square becoming green), so that positive (red) charge accumulates on the far side (across the disc, 180 degrees away) ([Y1] upper square becoming red). The shaft's polarized charges attach to the nearest sectors on disc B, resulting in negative charge on B [Y] closer to the original positive charge on A, and positive charge on the opposite side of B [Y1]. After an additional 45° rotation ([Z] near lower chain middle), the positive (red) charge on A (lower chain) is repelled by a positive (red) charge on B ([Z] upper chain) approaching. The first collection comb ([Z] arrow-tipped lines to triangles) encountered allows both positive (red) charges to leave the sectors neutral (squares becoming black), and accumulate in the Leyden jar anode (red triangle) attracted to the Leyden jar cathode (green triangle). The charge completes the cycle across the discs when a spark (yellow zigzag) discharges the Leyden jar (red and green triangles).

As B rotates 90° clockwise (left to right), the charges that have been induced on it line up with the brushes next to disc A [X, X1]. The charges on B induce the opposite polarization of the A-brushes' shaft, and the shaft's polarization is transferred to its disc. Disc B keeps rotating and its charges are accumulated by the nearest charge-collection combs.

Disc A rotates 90° so that its charges line up with the brush of disc B [Y, Y1], where an opposite charge-polarization is induced on the B conducting shaft and the nearest sectors of B, similar to the description two paragraphs above.

The process repeats, with each charge polarization on A inducing polarization on B, inducing polarization on A, etc.  The "influence" of neighboring attractive sectors induces exponentially larger charges, until balanced by the conducting shaft's finite capacitance. All of these induced positive and negative charges are collected by combs to charge the Leyden jars, electrical charge-storage devices similar to capacitors. The mechanical energy required to separate the opposing charges on the adjacent sectors provides the energy source for the electrical output.

See also
Kelvin water dropper
Pelletron
Van de Graaff generator
Tesla coil

References
"History of Electrostatic Generators". Hans-Peter Mathematick Technick Algorithmick Linguistick Omnium Gatherum.
de Queiroz, Antonio Carlos M., "The Wimshurst Electrostatic Machine"
Weisstein, Eric W., "Wimshurst Machine".
Bossert, François, "Wimshurst machine". Lycée Louis Couffignal, Strasbourg. (English version)
Charrier Jacques "La machine de Wimshurst". Faculté des Sciences de Nantes.

External links

The Wimshurst Machine Website: Photos and Video Clips of a Wimshurst Machine
MIT video demonstration and explanation of a Wimshurst machine (MIT TechTV physics demo)

Electrostatic generators
Electrical instruments
Historical scientific instruments
Articles containing video clips